Born in 1978, it is the Radio with an Italian national radio station that broadcasts Pop music and Italian music.

It is also broadcast on SKY Italia channel 700 and was also broadcast for few months on Worldspace.

Weekday programming
RDS's primary weekday programming includes:

Personalities
 Valerio Scarponi
 Claudio Guerrini
 Anna Pettinelli
 Sergio Friscia
 Max Pagani
 Filippo Firli
 Paolo Piva
 Valerio Scarponi
 Petra Loreggian
 Flippo Ferraro
  Marlen Pizzo
  Chiara de Pisa
   Flippo Firli
    Giuditta Arecco
     Roberta Lanfranchi   
 Max Del Buono
 Beppe De Marco
 Melania Agrimano
 Corrado Trisoglio
 Renzo di Falco
  Danny Virgilio

Bumpers
Until 2015, RDS knowns only one bumper. From 28 September 2015 RDS, adds five more bumper, one with a choir, one with a loop, one with doubts, one with an guitar, and one with a DJ. The summer bumpers are the same: six bumpers. In the first there are people singing the summer, in the second with sparkling sound, the third is a fast bumper and the voice starts after a short music, in the fourth there are girls, in the fifth is a romantic song and is the slowest summer bumper and in the last bumper a person says Estate (summer) at low voice. From 10 September 2018 RDS (Most comes back in other occasion) comes seven new bumper: The first is a long bumper. The second and the third has a Christmas variant, the four is a slow bumper, the fifth and the sixth are the same, but in the sixth after a short music the name is repeat like other bumper, and the final bumper (with guitar and like the fourth bumper with NEW HIT) is (almost) with the similar structure of the fourth bumper before September 10, 2018, but the warning (Selezioniamo le migliori Novità, per trasformarle in grandi successi.) is before Novità that it is said three instead five times and a slower time instead to be Novità before the warning and the slogan (Musica Nuova (New Music)) but RDS is the same: is at end of the bumper like other bumpers: RDS!!! (instruments play the jingle instead people saying it for the first time!). As the first mid of June 2019, RDS adds five new bumpers: The first is a DJ, the second is people saying: Voglia d'Estate (Italian for Summer Like), the third is a person saying the slogan at rap time, the fourth is a girl saying the slogan and it is not the bumper showed before 20 and 40 minutes, and the final bumper is similar, but the RDS slogan it says two times. However, the six bumper of Summer until 2018 there are used after 30 minutes after RDS Novità without the full bumper replaying some warning (different: Ricordare un emozione, con un successo senza tempo.), similar to New Hit Bumper. In Summer 2020 there are the same. From Christmas 2018, RDS adds two bumper added from 10 September 2018 in Christmas version with bells. The other Christmas Bumpers for 151.54.33.102 are unknown. The 00:00 Time until September 9, 2018 a speaker will say the hour and then the conductors will talk. As of September 10, RDS add a New Bumper where they say the hour and after there are people saying :Whoo! and next the up said bumper. After there all (9 songs), there are music and the Radio name's. In Summer 2020, Rosaria Renna says in what Estate (in English Summer) the song that will play it was famous (from 1980 to 2010 for 30 years).

Past personalities
 Stefano Piccirillo (now at Radio Kiss Kiss)
 Mauro Marino (now at Radio Kiss Kiss)
 Gigi Ariemma (now at Radio Capital)
 Federico Russo (now at Radio Deejay)
 Elena Di Dioccio
 Maurizio Costanzo
 Barty Colucci (now at RTL 102.5)
 Roberto Coppola 
 Andrea Pellizzari (now at Radio Deejay)

References

External links
 Official site 

Mass media in Rome
Radio stations in Italy
Radio stations established in 1978
1978 establishments in Italy